WXAG (1470 AM) is a radio station broadcasting an Urban Contemporary gospel format. Licensed to Athens, Georgia, United States, the station is currently owned by Mecca Communications, Inc.

History
The station went on the air as WCCD on 1979-11-21.  on 1982-10-26, the station changed its call sign to the current WXAG.

References

External links

XAG
Radio stations established in 1979
1979 establishments in Georgia (U.S. state)
XAG